Rasmus Therkildsen (born 1990 or 1991), is a Danish singer where he came in third place of the eleventh season of the Danish version of the X Factor.

Performances during X Factor

Discography

Singles
 "Rescue" (2018)

EPs

References

External links

Danish male singers
Living people
Year of birth uncertain
Year of birth missing (living people)